

Hermann von Oppeln-Bronikowski (2 January 1899 – 19 September 1966) was an Olympic equestrian, winning a gold medal in the team dressage at the 1936 Olympics.  He later served as a panzer general during World War II.  

As a lieutenant during World War I, he was awarded the Iron Cross in 1918.

During World War II, he served with distinction in Poland in 1939 and then on the Russian Front, commanding several tanks that were knocked out and personally leading several ad hoc attacks.

Von Oppeln led the desperate attack of the 22nd Panzer Division on the 19th of November 1943 in an attempt to forestall the encirclement of German forces in Stalingrad.

He was considered an excellent panzer commander, but had problems with higher authority as he was an excessive drinker. In one particular instance, as an Oberst commanding the 100th Panzer Division at Falaise, France; he was visited at 8:15 in the morning on 11 May 1944 by Rommel, who was satisfied with the forces' defensive preparations, but said to him – You lazy stinkers, what happens if the enemy invasion begins before 8:30! Von Oppeln, who had gone to sleep in his now crumpled and tobacco-smelling uniform, and still had alcohol on his breath, could only reply Catastrophe and Rommel laughed. Von Oppeln led a panzer counter-attack on the invading forces immediately after the D-Day Invasion, and was told by his commanding officer that if he did not throw the British back into the sea, the war would be lost. Some of his tanks managed to reach the coast, but were soon forced to withdraw, with the counter-attack subsequently failing. D-Day was the major turning point of the war on the Western front.

He commanded the 20th Panzer Division and was awarded the Knight's Cross of the Iron Cross with Oak Leaves and Swords. 

He was among Cornelius Ryan's interviewees when Ryan was preparing The Longest Day. 

He died of a heart attack in 1966.

Awards
 Iron Cross (1914) 2nd Class (28 May 1918) & 1st Class (14 October 1918)
 Clasp to the Iron Cross (1939) 2nd Class (25 September 1939) & 1st Class (10 November 1939)
 German Cross in Gold on 7 August 1943 as Oberst in Panzer-Regiment 11
 Knight's Cross of the Iron Cross with Oak Leaves and Swords
 Knight's Cross on 1 January 1943 as Oberst and commander of Panzer-Regiment 204
 Oak Leaves on 28 July 1944 as Oberst and commander of Panzer-Regiment 22
 Swords on 17 April 1945 as Generalmajor and commander of the 20. Panzer-Division

References

Citations

Bibliography

 
 
 

1899 births
1966 deaths
German Army personnel of World War I
Recipients of the clasp to the Iron Cross, 1st class
Major generals of the German Army (Wehrmacht)
Panzer commanders
Recipients of the Gold German Cross
Recipients of the Knight's Cross of the Iron Cross with Oak Leaves and Swords
German dressage riders
Equestrians at the 1936 Summer Olympics
German male equestrians
Olympic gold medalists for Germany
Sportspeople from Berlin
People from the Province of Brandenburg
Olympic medalists in equestrian
Medalists at the 1936 Summer Olympics
German people of Polish descent
Military personnel from Berlin
German Army generals of World War II